AEDC Hypervelocity Wind Tunnel 9 is a hypersonic wind tunnel owned by the United States Air Force and operated by National Aerospace Solutions  The facility can generate high Mach numbers and high Reynolds for hypersonic ground testing and the validation of computational simulations for the Air Force and Department of Defense.

History 
After World War II several critical facilities and scientists were brought to America to continue research into supersonic missiles.  In July 1945, the custody of the Kochel wind tunnel facilities was awarded to the Navy to be installed at the Naval Ordnance Laboratory at White Oak, Maryland. In 1967 congress granted approval for the construction of Tunnel 9.  The facility became operational in 1976 and has since been providing aerodynamic simulation in critical altitude regimes associated with strategic offensive missile systems, advanced defensive interceptor systems, and hypersonic vehicle technologies.

Capabilities
Tunnel 9 has 2.9 to 5 ft  diameter test section.  The facility can generate air flow up to Mach 14 with Reynolds numbers between 4 - 7.6 million per ft.  Pressure and temperature can be controlled to further simulate flight altitudes from sea level to 173,000 ft.

See also 
 Wind tunnel
 Shock tube
 Ludwieg tube

References

External links
 Arnold Engineering Development Center (official)
 Arnold Engineering Development Center at GlobalSecurity.org

Buildings and structures in Montgomery County, Maryland
Wind tunnels
Equipment of the United States Air Force